Anse du Gouverneur  is a quartier and beach of Saint Barthélemy in the Caribbean. It is located in the southern part of the island.

Populated places in Saint Barthélemy
Quartiers of Saint Barthélemy